Kat Whata-Simpkins (born 4 June 1990) is a New Zealand rugby union and rugby league player. She currently plays for the New Zealand Women's Sevens team.

Whata-Simpkins first represented New Zealand  as a member of the Kiwi Ferns rugby league team in 2008. This was followed by stints in the New Zealand Maori Rugby Sevens team from 2008 to 2009, the Black Ferns in 2011, and the New Zealand Maori League team in 2012. She started her international sevens career in 2014.

References

External links
All Blacks Profile

1990 births
Living people
New Zealand female rugby league players
New Zealand female rugby union players
New Zealand women's international rugby union players
New Zealand female rugby sevens players
New Zealand women's international rugby sevens players
New Zealand Māori rugby league players
New Zealand Māori rugby union players